Garfield Elementary School may refer to:

in the United States
(by state then city)
 Garfield Elementary School (Garfield, Arkansas), listed on the NRHP in Benton County, Arkansas
 Garfield Elementary School (San Francisco, California)
 Garfield Elementary School (Santa Ana, California)
 Garfield Elementary School (Boise, Idaho)
 Garfield Elementary School (Elgin, Illinois) in Elgin Area School District U46
 Garfield Elementary School (Moline, Illinois),  listed on the NRHP in Rock Island County, Illinois
 Garfield Elementary School (Abilene, Kansas), listed on the NRHP in Dickinson County, Kansas
 Garfield Elementary School (Livonia, Michigan), where Kevin Rogers began
 Garfield Elementary School (Medina, Ohio)